Morita Fukui (July 14, 1885 – December 27, 1965) was the first Commissioner of Baseball in Japan. (Matsutarō Shōriki, media mogul and owner of the Yomiuri Giants, was instrumental in the formation of Nippon Professional Baseball in 1949–1950, and acted unofficially as the league's first commissioner in 1950.)

References

Baseball executives
Baseball in Japan
Nippon Professional Baseball commissioners
1885 births
1965 deaths
Prosecutors General of Japan